"Bitch" is a short story written by Roald Dahl, and it is the second appearance of Dahl's character Uncle Oswald.

Plot
This story starts with Dahl introducing his Uncle Oswald's diary. He then goes on to the story, which begins in Paris on a Wednesday. At the start of the diary entry, Dahl's fictitious Uncle Oswald was trying a new honey sent by his friend when someone by the name of Henri Biotte called him and told him to go over to the latter's house. Uncle Oswald then introduces Henri Biotte in a flash-back, whom he met three years previously in Provence where he went to spend a summer week-end with a lady. Biotte was a fellow guest in Provence like Uncle Oswald.

It is then discovered that Biotte was a Belgian olfactory chemist with an amazing sense of smell. He approached Uncle Oswald with the intention of asking for funding to continue his research and cultivation of an 8th scent that humans are supposedly able to smell. Biotte said that humans have a total of eight types of olfactory nerves and cells, but only seven of them are used actively, while the last one is dormant due to lack of use. He wanted to cultivate a smell to unlock the last nerve in the hope of using it to control the world. The last smell is the smell related to the sexual psychology of humans.

Biotte then goes on to explain the system of smell to Uncle Oswald.

The flash-back ends with Uncle Oswald reaching Biotte's laboratory. Biotte had finally cultivated the desired smell, called Bitch, named by both the author and himself. However, only eleven cubic centimetres have been produced over a long period of time. After lending him some nose plugs and a face mask, Pierre Lacaille, a boxer hired by Biotte to be a test subject, turns up. The desired result of this test is that the man become aroused by the new smell and unconsciously have sex with the female test subject (Biotte's assistant and girlfriend Simone) without exhaustion or control, until the effects wear off. Biotte must also not be able to stop the male subject from continuing the sexual intercourse as a desired result. The test is successful and the boxer is paid. However, the boxer was not able to recall doing anything for the past six minutes and twenty-three seconds during which he was having sex with the woman. The effective distance of the smell was also recorded. The smell is ineffective on female subjects.

The next morning, the author discovers that Simone had sprayed herself with the remaining dose of Bitch and had Biotte smell her, whereupon he erupted into a sexual frenzy that killed him before he could write out the formula for the smell. He had a weak heart, which caused him to die easily. As the formula was not written down, the author is left with only one cubic centimetre of the liquid that Biotte had given him the previous day. He decides to make full use of it to humiliate the President of the United States.

He plans to plant a capsule made by his friend Marcel Brossolet around the ribbon of a stalk of flowers meant for Mrs. Elvira Ponsomby, who will be appearing on television with the President regarding a policy statement at a dinner given in his honor by the Daughters of the American Revolution in the ballroom of Waldorf Astoria. The author first brings a bouquet of orchids from a local florist. He then hid his capsule beneath the ribbon holding the flowers together, and delivers it to Mrs. Ponsomby's suite with the claim that it is for the President. During the broadcast, the capsule would burst open and the liquid would flow into Mrs. Ponsomby's bosom. The President would be aroused by the smell and begin having sex with all the women present, leading to his humiliation.

When the author goes to Mrs. Ponsomby's suite to deliver the flowers, she decides to wear them on her dress. However, she had to unpin the smaller flower pinned onto her dress. Due to her being incredibly fat with a huge bosom, she had difficulty doing it. After getting the author to remove the smaller flower, they discovered that they did not have another safety pin to attach the orchids. Finally, Mrs. Ponsomby decided to use the safety pin from the first flower and before the author could stop her, she drove it into the stalk of the orchids, bursting the capsule hidden there unintentionally.

"...the two of us were millions of miles up in outer space, flying through the universe in a shower of meteorites all red and gold. I was riding her bareback... "Faster!" I shouted, jabbing long spurs into her flanks. "Go faster!" Faster and still faster she flew, spurting and spinning around the rim of the sky, her mane streaming with sun, and snow waving out of her tail. The sense of power I had was overwhelming. I was unassailable, supreme. I was the Lord of the Universe, scattering the planets and catching the stars in the palm of my hand..."

"Oh, ecstasy and ravishment! Oh, Jericho and Tyre and Sidon! The walls came tumbling down and the firmament disintegrated, and out of the smoke and fire of the explosion, the sitting-room in the Waldorf Towers came swimming slowly back into my consciousness like a rainy day..."

When he awakes, he is naked and the suite has been ransacked. The story ends with Mrs. Ponsomby telling the author "Young man, I don't know who you are, but you've done me a power of good."

Publications
It was originally published in the July 1974 issue of Playboy, and appears as part of Dahl's short story collection Switch Bitch.

See also

 "Switch Bitch"
 "My Uncle Oswald"
 "The Visitor"

References

Short stories by Roald Dahl
Short stories set in Paris
1974 short stories
Works originally published in Playboy